Quantitative geography is a subfield of geography that develops, tests, and uses mathematical and statistical methods to analyze and model geographic phenomena and patterns. It aims to explain and predict the distribution and dynamics of human and physical geography through the collection and analysis of quantifiable data. The approach quantitative geographers take is generally in line with the scientific method, where a falsifiable hypothesis is generated, and then tested through observational studies. This has received criticism, and in recent years, quantitative geography has moved to include systematic model creation and understanding the limits of their models. This approach is used to study a wide range of topics, including population demographics, urbanization, environmental patterns, and the spatial distribution of economic activity. The methods of quantitative geography are often contrasted by those employed by qualitative geography, which is more focused on observing and recording characteristics of geographic place.

History

Quantitative geography emerged in the mid-20th century as a response to the increasing demand for more systematic, empirical, and data-driven approaches to studying geographic phenomena. It is a direct product of the quantitative revolution in geography. 

It was influenced by developments in statistics, mathematics, computer science, and the physical sciences. Quantitative geographers sought to use mathematical and statistical methods to better understand patterns, relationships, and processes in the spatial distribution of human and physical phenomena. 

Computers perhaps had the most profound impact on quantitative geography, with techniques such as map analysis, regression analysis, and spatial statistics to investigate various geographic questions.  In the 1950s and 1960s, advances in computer technology facilitated the application of quantitative methods in geography, leading to new techniques such as geographic information systems (GIS).  Notable early pioneers in GIS are Roger Tomlinson and Waldo Tobler.  Simultaneously, new data sources, such as remote sensing and GPS, were incorporated into geographic research.  These tools enabled geographers to collect, analyze, and visualize large amounts of spatial data in new ways, further advancing the field of quantitative geography.

In the late 20th century, quantitative geography became a central discipline within geography, and its influence was felt in fields such as urban, economic, and environmental geography. Today, research in quantitative geography continues, focusing on using innovative quantitative methods and technologies to address complex geographic questions and problems.

Techniques and subfields

Quantitative revolution

Laws of geography

The concept of laws in geography is a product of the quantitative revolution and is a central focus of quantitative geography.  Their emergence is highly influential and one of the major contributions of quantitative geography to the broader branch of technical geography.  The discipline of geography is unlikely to settle the matter anytime soon.  Several laws have been proposed, and Tobler's first law of geography is the most widely accepted.  The first law of geography, and its relation to spatial autocorrelation, is highly influential in the development of technical geography. 

Some have argued that geographic laws do not need to be numbered.  The existence of a first invites a second, and many are proposed as that.  It has also been proposed that Tobler's first law of geography should be moved to the second and replaced with another.  A few of the proposed laws of geography are below:

 Tobler's first law of geography: "Everything is related to everything else, but near things are more related than distant"
 Tobler's second law of geography: "the phenomenon external to a geographic area of interest affects what goes on inside."
 Arbia's law of geography: "Everything is related to everything else, but things observed at a coarse spatial resolution are more related than things observed at a finer resolution."
 Uncertainty principle: "that the geographic world is infinitely complex and that any representation must therefore contain elements of uncertainty, that many definitions used in acquiring geographic data contain elements of vagueness, and that it is impossible to measure location on the Earth's surface exactly."

Criticism

Critical geography has levied many criticisms against the positivist approach in quantitative geography, including:

Reductionism: Critics argue that the focus on quantifying data and using mathematical models can oversimplify complex social and spatial phenomena.

Lack of context: Some argue that quantification can ignore a particular place's unique cultural and historical contexts.

Dependence on technology: Quantitative geography heavily relies on technology and digital mapping tools, which can limit its ability to address certain geographical issues.

Bias: Data collection methods can introduce bias into the analysis, and existing power structures may influence the types of data collected and analyzed.

Limited scope: Quantitative geography narrowly focuses on spatial data and can miss important aspects of human geographies, such as culture, politics, and social relations.

Lack of critical perspective: Critics argue that the focus on objective and empirical data analysis can detract from a critical perspective on geographical issues and lead to a lack of engagement with important social and political questions.

Influential geographers

Dana Tomlin – developer of map algebra
Edward Augustus Ackerman (1911–1973) - advocated for approaching human environment interaction as an interaction between systems.
Fred K. Schaefer (1904–1953)- called for a scientific approach to geography based upon the search for geographical laws
Michael DeMers (born 1951) – geographer that wrote numerous books contributing to geographic information systems
Mark Monmonier (born 1943) – cartographic theorist that wrote numerous books contributing to geographic information systems
Mei-Po Kwan (born 1962) - geographer that coined the uncertain geographic context problem and the neighborhood effect averaging problem.
Michael Frank Goodchild (born 1944) – GIS scholar and winner of the RGS founder's medal in 2003
Richard J. Chorley (1927–2002) - played an instrumental role in bringing in the use of systems theory to geography.
Roger Tomlinson (1933–2014) – the primary originator of modern geographic information systems
Torsten Hägerstrand (1916–2004)- established the discipline of time geography
Waldo Tobler (1930–2018) – coined the first and second law of geography
William Bunge (1928–2013) - early quantitative geographer 
William Garrison (1924–2015) - Early leader of the quantitative revolution and one of the founders of regional science.

See also

Areography (geography of Mars)
Concepts and Techniques in Modern Geography
Earth system science
Environmental science
Environmental studies
Geomorphology
Neogeography
Planetary science
Uncertain geographic context problem

Notes

References

Technical geography